The 1881 South Australian Football Association season was the 5th season of the top-level Australian rules football competition in South Australia. The premiership season began on Saturday 7 May.

 went on to record its 4th consecutive premiership.

The years premiership trophy was called the Fowler Challenge Cup.

Kensington and   merged to create a full squad but resigned from the competition after 4 games.

Premiership season

Round 1

Round 2

Round 3

Round 4

Round 5

Round 6

Round 7

Round 8

Round 9

Round 10

Round 11

Round 12

Round 13

Round 14

Round 15

Round 16

Round 17

Ladder

Note:
 South Adelaide played South Park three times for a 1-1-1 record; South Adelaide were ranked above South Park on a superior head-to-head record against Norwood (0-2-1 to 0-3).
 Adelaide/Kensington withdrew from the competition after Round 4; all published ladders record their Round 5 match against Norwood as a win for Norwood on forfeit.

Intercolonial matches

Additional matches

References

SANFL
South Australian National Football League seasons